Educating Rita is a stage comedy by British playwright Willy Russell. It is a play for two actors set entirely in the office of an Open University tutor.

Commissioned by the Royal Shakespeare Company, Educating Rita premièred at The Warehouse, London, in June 1980 starring Julie Walters and Mark Kingston. The play was directed by Mike Ockrent.

Plot summary
The plays follows the relationship between a 26-year-old Liverpudlian working class hairdresser and Frank, a middle-aged university lecturer, during the course of a year. In the play Frank has no surname, but when the film was made he became Dr. Frank Bryant.

Susan (who initially calls herself Rita), dissatisfied with the routine of her work and social life, seeks inner growth by signing up for and attending an Open University course in English Literature. The play opens as 'Rita' meets her tutor, Frank, for the first time. Frank is a middle-aged, alcoholic career academic who has taken on the tutorship to pay for his drink. The two have an immediate and profound effect on one another; Frank is impressed by Susan's verve and earnestness and is forced to re-examine his attitudes and position in life; Susan finds Frank's tutelage opens doors to a bohemian lifestyle and a new self-confidence. However, Frank's bitterness and cynicism return as he notices Susan beginning to adopt the pretensions of the university culture he despises. Susan becomes disillusioned by a friend's attempted suicide and realises that her new social niche is rife with the same dishonesty and superficiality she had previously sought to escape. The play ends as Frank, sent to Australia on a sabbatical, welcomes the possibilities of the change.

Themes
The play deals with the concept of freedom, change, Britain's class system, the shortcomings of institutional education, and the nature of self-development and of personal relationships. The play borrows from the 1913 George Bernard Shaw play Pygmalion, itself based upon archetypes from Greek myth.

Film adaptation

The play was adapted by Russell for a 1983 film with Michael Caine and Julie Walters, directed by Lewis Gilbert.

Radio adaptation
The play was adapted by Russell for radio in 2009. It starred Bill Nighy and Laura Dos Santos directed by Kirsty Williams, and was a 90-minute play broadcast on BBC Radio 4 on Boxing Day 2009.

Revivals
In 1987, Laurie Metcalf starred as Rita in a production Off-Broadway at the Westside Theatre produced by the Steppenwolf Theater Company.

From June to July 2001, the Williamstown Theatre Festival mounted a production of Educating Rita at the Nikos Stage starring Jacqueline McKenzie as Rita and Edward Herrmann as Frank. The production was directed by Bruce Paltrow and was critically acclaimed with critics touting McKenzie's performance as "wonderfully beguiling and irrepressible...one of the best performances of the year".

From 26 March to 8 May 2010, as part of the Willy Russell season at the Menier Chocolate Factory, Laura Dos Santos reprised her radio performance on stage as Rita alongside Larry Lamb as Frank. This was the production's first London West End revival. This production transferred to the Trafalgar Studios in London's West End from 8 July to 30 October 2010, produced by Sonia Friedman. Laura Dos Santos reprised her radio and Menier Chocolate Factory performance as Rita, and Frank was played by renowned actor Tim Pigott-Smith. Like the Willy Russell season at the Menier Chocolate Factory, the production ran in repertory alongside Shirley Valentine starring Meera Syal. A UK tour played in 2012, starring Claire Sweeney and Matthew Kelly as Rita and Frank respectively.

A 35th anniversary production was staged at Liverpool Playhouse from 6 February to 7 March 2015, starring Leanne Best as Rita and Con O'Neill as Frank, directed by Gemma Bodinetz.  The same year the Chichester Festival staged a production with Lenny Henry and Lashana Lynch as Frank and Rita.

Awards and nominations
The original production received the 1980 Olivier Award nomination for Comedy Performance of the Year for Julie Walters and won for Comedy of the Year.

See also
 Galatea of Greek mythology
 My Fair Lady
 Pretty Woman

References

Further reading

External links
 
 
 Film Review: Educating Rita

1980 plays
Comedy plays
Off-Broadway plays
Laurence Olivier Award-winning plays
Open University
Plays based on books
West End plays
Plays by Willy Russell
British plays adapted into films
Universities and colleges in art
Two-handers

es:Educando a Rita
fr:L'Éducation de Rita
he:לחנך את ריטה
pt:Educating Rita